Gomphus brunneus is a species of fungus in the genus Gomphus, family Gomphaceae. It has been recorded from rainforest in the Yucatan Peninsula in Mexico, as well as Uganda and Democratic Republic of Congo in Africa.

References

External links

Fungi of Mexico
Gomphaceae
Fungi of Africa
Fungi described in 1958
Fungi without expected TNC conservation status